Peanuts and Diamonds and Other Jewels is a studio album by American country singer-songwriter Bill Anderson. It was released in September 1976 on MCA Records. It was co-produced by Owen Bradley and Buddy Killen. It was Anderson's twenty fifth studio recording released during his musical career and second to be released in 1976. The album included three singles issued between 1975 and 1976, two of which became major country hits in both the United States and Canada.

Background and content
Peanuts and Diamonds and Other Jewels was recorded between 1975 and 1976. The sessions took place at Bradley's Barn, a studio located in Mount Juliet, Tennessee. The sessions were produced by Owen Bradley and Buddy Killen. This was Anderson's first production assignment with Killen. The album was Anderson's twenty fifth overall, since beginning his first release debuted in 1963. The project consisted of ten new studio recordings. Five of the album's tracks were written by Anderson. Other tracks included on the album were written by Curly Putnam, Bobby Braddock and Glenn Martin.

Release and chart performance
Peanuts, Diamonds and Other Jewels was released in September 1976 on MCA Records, his second studio album released that year. The album was issued as a vinyl LP, with five songs featured on each side of the record. It spent 14 weeks on the Billboard Top Country Albums chart before peaking at number 12 in November 1976. The album's first single released was the track "Thanks" in July 1975. The single became a minor hit on the Billboard Hot Country Singles chart, reaching number 24.

The title track ("Peanuts and Diamonds") was released as the second single in July 1976. The song became a major hit after it reached number ten on the Billboard country songs chart. The song also reached the top ten of the RPM Country Chart in Canada, peaking at number seven. The third and final single issued was the track "Liars One, Believers Zero" in November 1976. It also became a top ten hit on the Billboard country chart when it reached number six in February 1977. The song was another major hit in Canada, reaching number five on the Canadian country singles chart.

Track listing

Personnel
All credits are adapted from the liner notes of Peanuts and Diamonds and Other Jewels.

Musical personnel

 Joe Allen – bass
 Bill Anderson – lead vocals
 David Briggs – piano
 Martin Chantry – strings
 Roy Christensen – strings
 Jimmy Colvard – guitar
 Bobby Emmons – organ
 Gregg Galbraith – guitar
 Sonny Garrish – steel guitar
 Carl Gorozetzky – strings
 Doyle Grisham – steel guitar
 The Holladays – background vocals
 The Jordanaires – background vocals

 Martin Katahn – strings
 Dave Kirby – guitar
 Sheldon Kurland – strings
 Bob Leech – bass
 Larry Londin – drums
 Kenny Malone – drums
 Bob Moore – bass
 The Nashville Edition – background vocals
 Jack Smith – steel guitar
 Donald Teal – strings
 Bobby Wood – piano
 Woody Woodard – organ
 Gary Vanosdale – strings

Technical personnel
 Bobby Bradley – engineering
 Owen Bradley – producer
 David Hogan – cover design
 Hot Graphics – cover design
 Buddy Killen – producer
 Joe Mills – engineering
 John R. Miller – photography
 Ernie Winfrey – engineering

Chart performance

Release history

References

1976 albums
Albums produced by Owen Bradley
Bill Anderson (singer) albums
MCA Records albums